Evenk Autonomous Okrug was a federal subject of Russia until December 31, 2006.  On January 1, 2007, it was merged into Krasnoyarsk Krai along with Taymyr Autonomous Okrug.  During the transitional period it retains a special administrative status within Krasnoyarsk Krai.

Districts:
Evenkiysky
Urban-type settlements under the district's jurisdiction:
Tura (administrative center)
with 3 selsovets under the district's jurisdiction.
Baykitsky (Байкитский)
Ilimpiyskiy (Илимпийский)
Tungussko-Chunsky (Тунгусско-Чунский)

See also
Administrative divisions of Krasnoyarsk Krai
Administrative divisions of Taymyr Autonomous Okrug

References

Krasnoyarsk Krai
Evenk Autonomous Okrug